Markus Zimmermann (born October 31, 1978) is a German sculptor and performance artist.

Life 
In 2000 after graduating from high school, Markus Zimmermann began studying fine arts at the Kunstakademie Münster, Germany, in the sculptors class of Timm Ulrichs. For winter semester 2002, he changed to Braunschweig University of Art to Bogomir Ecker. There he completed his studies in 2006 with a diploma and was Masterstudent the following year. During his study research trips to New Zealand, France and Ireland took place. He lives and works in Berlin and Hannover.

Work 
Starting from the Wunderkammern of the late Renaissance and the Baroque, Markus Zimmermann has been developing countless small sculptures since 2003. These impress with their wealth of detail and precise design. He combines different materials such as cardboard, paper, plastic films, foam with plaster, wax and paint into new futuristic shapes. The presentation of the small sculptures took place on large shelves or tables, in displays or empty shop windows as room-filling installations, reminding the observers of stores or shops.

While the objects of the Wunderkammern are intended for viewing only, since 2006 Zimmermann has challenged the viewer with peep-boxes to take his art literally into their own hands. The lavishly designed boxes reveal fantastic landscapes and geometric spaces as they look inside. These boxes evoke connotations of theatrical stages or the Merzbau of artist Kurt Schwitters, likewise originating from Hanover. Lateral slits let light into the peep boxes and show the scenes in changing perspectives.

Since 2012 performances have followed. They are primarily characterized by playful interactions with the audience. Markus Zimmermann plays with the audience Mau Mau or bets for money; he destroys sacred objects of his childhood or asks the public to design sculptures themselves. The seemingly harmless performances cite strict rituals of the catholic liturgy and stage universal themes of mythology. In times of easily digitally produced effects and entertainment, Markus Zimmermann manages to create calm moments of mindfulness and presents. Free of ideological platitudes, he translates the views and demands of Joseph Beuys on social sculpture into action.

Since 2013, Markus Zimmermann has also appeared as the initiator of art projects in overarching art genres. In 2013, the Kunstfonds Foundation sponsored the project WELT OHNE ZEIT (World Without Time), a twenty-four-hour performance with 12 artists in the former Czech Cultural Center Berlin. As a team he develops and supervises the project IKONOSTASE in Munich, Berlin and at the Cebit in Hanover.

Zimmermann was one of the co-founders of the Berlin Arts Club in 2006. In 2013 Florian Dietrich, Martin Schepers and Markus Zimmermann founded the artist collective IKONOSTASE.

Awards 
In 2010, Markus Zimmermann was awarded the ars viva prize of the Kulturkreis der deutschen Wirtschaft.

Exhibitions 
2007
 Die Kunst der Sammelns, Museum Kunstpalast, Düsseldorf

2008
 –zoom+, Künstlerhaus Dortmund
 Schein, Galerie Birgit Ostermeier, Berlin
 An einem Wochenende im September, Schwerin Str. 42, Düsseldorf
 Believe me!, Kunst im Tunnel, Düsseldorf
 Bitte schön!, Kunsthalle Münster

2009
 Idyllismus, Tanzschule, München
 Verleihung Roelfs-Partner-Stipendium, Kunst im Tunnel, Düsseldorf
 verschachtelt, Junge Kunst e. V. Wolfsburg 
 Out of the box, Museum van Bommel van Dam, Venlo
 Scales of the universe, Galerie Jeanroch Dard, Paris
 Wer macht die Kunst?, hub:kunst.diskurs e.V. Hannover
 1000 x Ich, 1000 x Du, Tät, Berlin

2010
 Generating the Preview, Museum Sztuki Lodz
 Magicgruppe Kulturobjek, Bonnefantenmuseum, Maastricht
 ars-viva-Preis 2010 – Labor, Kunstsammlungen Chemnitz
 Bewahrung und Verfall, Deutsches Technikmuseum Berlin
 Larger than life – stranger than fiction, 11.Triennale Kleinplastik, Fellbach
 Leinen los, Herbstausstellung at Kunstverein Hannover
 Die Welt als Modell, Montag Stiftung Kunst und Gesellschaft Bonn
 Schreitend, Hermannshof, Völksen, Völksen

2011
 From Trash to Treasure, Kunsthalle Kiel
 Verbrechen und Bild, Künstlerverein Walkmühle, Wiesbaden
 ars-viva 10/11 Labor, Kunstmuseum Stuttgart

2012
 Magicgruppe Kulturobjekt, Ludwig Forum für Internationale Kunst, Aachen

2013
 15 Jahre Junge Kunst, Junge Kunst, Wolfsburg
 Glaube, Liebe, Hoffnung, Rubenstrasse 42, Köln
 Laterna Magica, Kunstverein Wolfenbüttel 

2014
 Welt ohne Zeit – Turnover,  performance at Czech Kulturzentrum Berlin
 IKONOSTASE II – Rettet die Wirtschaft, installation Haus der Deutschen Wirtschaft, Berlin
 Episode 7, another space, Kopenhagen

2015
 SUPERFILIALE – marzipan pigs, installation and performance, Simultanhalle Köln
 SUPERFILIALE – Picknick am Berg, installation and performance, KW Institute for Contemporary Art, Berlin
 IKONOSTASE III – Praxis Freiheit, installation and performance at CeBIT, Hannover 
 Karma Spin, Performance, frontviews gallery at Leipziger Str. 63, Berlin

2016
 Sukkot, Installation und Performance, Ausstellungsraum D21, Leipzig
 me and you, ARCA, Performance, Emscherkunst 2016 – Emscher Quelle and Dortmunder U 
 me and you, Museum ON/OFF, Performance, Centre Georges Pompidou, Paris
 Ruhestörung, Performance, Britzenale Berlin

External links 
 Markus Zimmermann website
 works
 Markus Zimmermann on Instagram
 Künstlerkollektiv IKONOSTASE Künstlerkollektiv IKONOSTASE
 interviewed on YouTube
 artist on ArtFacts.net

References

German male sculptors
21st-century German sculptors
21st-century German male artists
German performance artists
1978 births
Living people